Battle Creek  is a stream in the U.S. state of South Dakota. It is a tributary of the Cheyenne River, traversing Oglala Lakota and Pennington counties and the town of Keystone.

Battle Creek was named for a skirmish between two indigenous  tribes.

Battle Creek is fed by Iron Creek.

See also
List of rivers of South Dakota

References

Rivers of Custer County, South Dakota
Rivers of Oglala Lakota County, South Dakota
Rivers of Pennington County, South Dakota
Rivers of South Dakota